was a Japanese synthpop trio of the early 1980s led by singer/songwriter Masami Tsuchiya.

History
Ippu-Do debuted in 1979 with Normal, made up of Tsuchiya on vocals and guitar, Akira Mitake on keyboards, and Shoji Fujii on drums. Between 1980 and 1981 they released two follow-ups, Real and Radio Fantasy, the latter of which would be their first release outside Japan. The group thereafter went on hiatus, with Tsuchiya playing guitar with the band Japan on their final tour in 1982, and beginning a solo career.

The group briefly reappeared in 1983 as a duo of Tsuchiya and Mitake, recording the studio album Night Mirage, and the live Live And Zen, supported on both releases by drummer Steve Jansen and keyboardist Richard Barbieri of Japan, and bassist Percy Jones. Tsuchiya subsequently returned to his solo career, releasing several more albums in the 80s and beyond.

A 1998 compilation entitled Very Best September Love combined both group and Tsuchiya solo work, while 2010's Essence covered only group selections, including the first appearance on CD of some tracks. 2006 saw the release of a 7 CD + 1 DVD box set entitled Magic Vox - Ippu-Do Era 1979-1984, containing all five group albums, Tsuchiya's first solo album Rice Music from 1982, and a 1983 solo album by Mitake.

Discography

Studio albums
 (1979) Normal
 (1980) Real
 (1981) Radio Fantasy
 (1983) Night Mirage

Live album
 (1984) Live and Zen (recorded June 1983)

Compilations
 (1982) Lunatic Menu
 (1998) Very Best September Love (Ippu-Do/Masami Tsuchiya)
 (2006)  Magic Vox : Ippu-Do Era 1979-1984 (7-CD box set with DVD, includes Tsuchiya and Mitake solo releases)
 (2010) Essence - The Very Best Of Ippu-Do

References

External links

 

Japanese pop music groups
Japanese rock music groups
Japanese new wave musical groups
Musical groups established in 1979
Musical groups disestablished in 1984